KF Kastrioti Ferizaj is a professional football club from Kosovo which competes in the Third League (Group B). The club is based in Ferizaj. Their home ground is the Ferizaj Sports Complex which has a viewing capacity of 1,000.

See also
 List of football clubs in Kosovo

References

Football clubs in Kosovo
Association football clubs established in 1997